Manzoor Ahmed Khan Niazi (1922 – 9 April 2013) was a renowned Pakistani Qawwal and a classical musician in India and Pakistan. He belonged to the well-known family of Qawwals, Qawwal Bachchon Ka Gharana of Delhi.

Career

Manzoor Niazi Qawwal was the senior-most Qawwal in the Indo-Pak subcontinent. He had one of the most instantly recognizable and endearing voices among the qawwals. He was the leader of the gifted, albeit short-lived Qawwali group of the last century, a Qawwali Supergroup which Included his cousins Munshi Raziuddin Qawwal and Bahauddin Qawwal. Formed as the Manzoor Ahmed Khan Niazi Qawwal & Brothers qawwali group in 1937.

Quiad-e-Azam Muhammad Ali Jinnah gave him the title of Bulbul-e-Deccan. This ensemble lasted until 1966. After 1966, Manzoor Ahmed Khan Niazi turned to solo work and trained his sons Abdullah Manzoor Niazi and Masroor Ahmed Niazi. He also trained his cousin Munshi Raziuddin's Sons Farid Ayaz And Abu Muhammad, and his cousin Bahauddin Qawwal's sons Qawwal Najmuddin - Saifuddin & Brothers. He helped his own sons form their own ensemble. Manzoor Niazi occasionally assisted his sons during their concerts as the leader of the group. His Grandson Habib Niazi who is son of Masroor Niazi Later On, Became The Second Lead Singer In His Son Abdullah Niazi's Group. He was not Niazi by caste, So do not confused with his last name, he was not belongs to famous Pushtun Niazi tribe.

Manzoor Niazi Qawwal died on 9 April 2013 at age 91 at Karachi, Pakistan.

Awards and legacy
For His Sheer Devotion And Contribution For Sufi Music, Manzoor Ahmed Niazi  was honored with a Tamgha-e-Imtiaz Award (Medal of Excellence) Award by the President of Pakistan in 2006.

References

1922 births
2013 deaths
Pakistani qawwali singers
20th-century Pakistani male singers
Pakistani qawwali groups
Muhajir people